Robert Augustus Abban (born 29 March 1989) popularly known as Rob Photography is a Ghanaian photographer and cinematographer.

Early life and education
He was born at Saltpond in the Central Region of South Ghana. He started his early education at SS Peter and Paul Anglican School, Mfantsiman Basic DA School and his secondary school at National Vocational and Technical Institute, Biriwa, Cape Coast . He received a Diploma in Media Studies from Zepto Professional Trainining Institute, Accra.

Career
Robert started taking photographs of close family as a teenager and collection of snapshots from his daily life. He came into the Ghanaian creative scene first, most notably, as an event photographer. Robert's photographic career has included photographing a diverse list of Ghanaian celebrities, including Sarkodie,Stonebwoy, Shatta Wale, Kuami Eugene.
His work has featured at Ghana Music Awards UK, Ghana Music Awards USA, 3Music Awards, among others.

Awards and recognitions 
 2019, Best Event Photographer Winner – Ghana Events Awards
 2020, Photographer of the Year, Nominee – Ghana National Communications Awards
 2021, Listed as Nominee – 50 Most Influential Young Ghanaians, Avance Media
 2022, Best Photographer, Listed as Nominee – Ghana Entertainment Awards, USA
 2022, Best Event Photographer, Winner – Ghana Style Awards

References

Living people
Ghanaian photographers
1989 births
Ghanaian cinematographers